John Henry Moore II (August 5, 1927 – July 19, 2013) was an American lawyer and United States district judge of the United States District Court for the Middle District of Florida.

Education and career

Born in Atlantic City, New Jersey, he received his Bachelor of Science degree from Syracuse University in 1952 and his Juris Doctor from the University of Florida College of Law in 1961. Moore served in the Naval Reserve from 1948 to 1971, and served on active duty in Korea before retiring with the rank of commander. Moore was in private practice in Atlanta, Georgia in 1961 with the firm of Fisher and Phillips before moving to Fort Lauderdale, Florida where he was a partner with the firms of Fleming, O'Bryan and Fleming and then Turner, Shaw and Moore from 1961 to 1967. Moore also served as attorney for the School Board of Broward County.

State judicial service

Moore served as a judge of the 17th Judicial Circuit of Florida from 1967 to 1977, serving as chief judge of that court from 1975 to 1977. Moore was nominated to United States District Court for the Southern District of Florida in 1976, but the Senate took no action. Moore served as a judge on the Florida Fourth District Court of Appeal from 1977 to 1981.

Federal judicial service

President Ronald Reagan nominated Moore to the United States District Court for the Middle District of Florida on November 4, 1981, to a new seat created by 92 Stat. 1629. Confirmed by the United States Senate on November 24, 1981, he received his commission on December 1, 1981. Moore served as Chief Judge from 1992 to 1995 and assumed senior status on December 31, 1995. Moore served with the Jacksonville division of the court. He died at his home in Jacksonville on July 19, 2013.

References

Sources
 

1927 births
2013 deaths
People from Atlantic City, New Jersey
Syracuse University alumni
Fredric G. Levin College of Law alumni
Judges of the United States District Court for the Middle District of Florida
United States district court judges appointed by Ronald Reagan
20th-century American judges
Judges of the Florida District Courts of Appeal
United States Navy personnel of the Korean War
United States Navy officers
United States Navy reservists